3C 288 is a radio galaxy located in the constellation Canes Venatici.

References

External links
 www.jb.man.ac.uk/atlas/
 3C288 = B1336+391 (Alan Bridle / 9 September 1999)

Radio galaxies
Canes Venatici
288
+39.39
2138068